The Al Shohada Mosque is a mosque in Sana'a, Yemen. It lies to the south of the ancient Great Mosque of Sana'a and Ghumdan Palace., between the Yemeni military defense complex (to the west) and Ashohada Cemetery (to the east).

See also
 List of mosques in Yemen

References

Mosques in Sanaa